Amy Correia (born September 12, 1968) is an American singer and songwriter who grew up in Lakeville, Massachusetts.

Biography
Correia lived in New York's Chinatown after graduating from Barnard College. She worked in advertising, writing copy by day, while at night honing her songwriting and performing in clubs like Sin-é Cafe on the Lower East Side. A chance meeting with Blind Melon guitarist, Christopher Thorn, who'd stopped by the small club while on tour, led the two to make several recordings which helped Correia eventually sign with Virgin Records.

While signed to Virgin Records, Correia recorded an album of songs at Daniel Lanois' Kingsway Studios in New Orleans with Christopher Thorn producing, but the album went unfinished. Correia left Virgin with her master recordings and signed with Capitol/EMI, which released her debut "Carnival Love" in 2000. Correia recorded the album "Lakeville" with her own money. It was produced by Mark Howard, who also has produced Willie Nelson and Lucinda Williams. The Canadian label, Nettwerk, licensed and released it in 2004.

Her third album, "You Go Your Way", recorded in 2009 with producer/arranger/bassist Paul Bryan, was funded by her fans. The story was picked up by Anthony Mason for CBS News, who featured Correia as one of a growing number of artists who are looking to their fans rather than a label to fund their albums.

Correia is the recipient of three 2012 Independent Music Awards. "You Go Your Way" was named best folk/singer-songwriter album by a panel of influential artists and industry professionals. "You Go Your Way" also won the Vox Pop award, determined by fan voting, for best folk/singer-songwriter album. The single, "Love Changes Everything" won the Vox Pop award for best love song.

Correia tours throughout the U.S. and has performed with artists including Marc Cohn, Richard Thompson, John Hiatt, Freedy Johnston, Emmylou Harris, Jason Crigler, Rebecca Martin, Josh Rouse, Duncan Sheik, Norah Jones, Bonnie Raitt, Richard Julian, Jesse Harris, Ollabelle, Aimee Mann, Kenny White, Jonathan Spottiswoode, Everclear, The Dandy Warhols, Allison Moorer, Tara McLean, Kendall Payne, Shannon McNally, Charlie Musselwhite, Jon Brion, Grant Lee Phillips, Dredd Scott, Julia Fordham, Jess Klein, Kerri Powers.

On March 25, 2022, Ms. Correia released a new EP of five songs entitled 'As We Are' produced by bassist Kimon Kirk. Americana UK premiered Correia's first official video for one of the songs from this record called "The Beggar”.  They wrote “It’s a powerful, emotionally connecting and effective style that works well alongside the changes in pace, the musical pauses and the moments when musical layers become more urgent.  A compelling video, creatively well-thought out and well-produced, adds texture and meaning to the song.” Americana UK went on to describe ‘As We Are’ as “a reflective, introspective record, featuring well-crafted songs and thought-provoking lyrical content.”

Under the Radar Magazine' raved: "Amy Correia is an Americana poet, her plainspoken eloquence conjuring spirits of backroads overgrown with weeds and empty alleyways crowded with thickening shadows...As We Are embodies the best of Correia’s artistic abilities, serving heaps of soul without sacrificing the sophistication of its form. The effort proves both romantic and devastating, Correia’s homegrown sensibilities feeling at once familiar and elusive, her band continuing alongside her in perfect harmony. Amy Correia is a treasure of her genre, still running strong, offering glints of sunlight through the haze, finding strange beauty even in the events of loss and destitution." [https://www.undertheradarmag.com/reviews/as_we_are_amy_correia]

Discography
 2000, Carnival Love (Capitol)
 2004, Lakeville (Nettwerk)
 2010, You Go Your Way (Independent release)
 2022, As We Are (Independent release)

Compilations and collaborations
 1997,  Richard Julian "Richard Julian”
 2001,  “I-10 Chronicles Vol. 2: One More for the Road” (Lead Vocalist, “Gasoline Alley/It's All Over Now”)
 2002,  "The Metropolitan Museum of Art: American Folk Music” (Composer/Arranger/Co-producer “Blind River Boy”)
 2005,  "Public Displays of Affection"(Composer/Arranger/Co-producer "Hold On")
 2005,  "She Do, She Don't" (Composer/Arranger/Co-producer "Lakeville")
 2005,  Jonathon Rice "Trouble is Real”
 2008,  "Join the Parade- Live" Marc Cohn (Featured vocalist on "Giving up the Ghost")
 2008,  "The Music of Jason Crigler" (Lead vocalist, "Bush and a Tree")
 2008,  Cynic "Traced in Air" (Seasons of Mist, 2008)
 2011,  Cynic "Carbon-Based Anatomy" (Seasons of Mist, 2011)
 2015,  Onward w Love (with Paul Masvidal from Cynic)

Radio
 KCRW "Morning Becomes Eclectic" (2000)
 NPR "Mountain Stage" (2000, 2004, 2007)
 NPR/WXPN "World Café " with David Dye (2000, 2004)
 WFUV Vin Scelsa's "Idiot's Delight" (2000, 2004)
 NPR "All Songs Considered" (2004)
 NPR/WNYC "Soundcheck " (2004)
 NPR/WUMB "Wood Songs Old Time Radio Hour" (2004)

Television
 2001,  "Late Night with Conan O'Brien" (NBC) – Composer/Performer, "Gin”
 2007,  "The Ellen DeGeneres Show" (NBC) – Performer, appearing with Marc Cohn
 2007,  "Good Morning America" (ABC) – Performer, appearing with Marc Cohn
 2007,  "The View" (ABC) – Performer, appearing with Marc Cohn
 2008,  "Men in Trees" (NBC) – Composer/Performer – "Daydream Car”
 2008,  "The Today Show" (NBC) – Performer, appearing with Marc Cohn

Filmography
 2000,  "79 Degrees in July" (Independent) – Writer/Arranger/Co-producer, "Angels Collide" and "Glorious Bluebirds”

References

Further reading
 Washington Post, Amy Correia's Unique Voice at the Iota (Concert Review) July 20, 2006
 The New York Times, Critic's Choice: New CDs by Jon Pareles, January 11, 2004
 The New York Times, Defying Types to Undermine Assumptions by Ann Powers, January 23, 2001
 Boston Herald, Just Push PLAY: Our Critics Pick Best CDs of 2004 Paste Magazine, Singer/songwriter Foots Bill for Outstanding New Album (Album Review) Dec 2004
 American Songwriter, Vulnerable & Fierce (Album Review) November 2004
 No Depression, No More Carnival Rides (Feature) by Russel Hall, November 2004
 Entertainment Weekly, Puts the Sweet in Bittersweet (Short Takes, Review) October 2004
 Harp Magazine, Rants and Faves'' (Album review) November 2004
 Timeout New York, Music (Concert Preview) October 3, 2004

External links
amycorreia.com: Official Website
Twitter Page
NPR: Live On Mountain Stage
On CBS Evening News

1968 births
Living people
American women singer-songwriters
Barnard College alumni
People from Lakeville, Massachusetts
Singers from New York City
Singer-songwriters from Massachusetts
20th-century American singers
20th-century American women singers
21st-century American singers
21st-century American women singers
Singer-songwriters from New York (state)